This is a complete list of placenames in Hampshire County, West Virginia. Placename entries are compiled from the United States Geological Survey's Geographic Names Information System.

Hampshire County placenames 

Geography of Hampshire County, West Virginia